Sašo Taljat (born 22 September 1989) is a Slovenian slalom canoeist who has competed at the international level since 2006.

He won two medals in the C2 event at the ICF Canoe Slalom World Championships with a gold in 2014 and a bronze in 2009. He also won one silver and one bronze medal in the C2 event at the European Championships.

At the 2012 Summer Olympics in London he competed in the C2 event where he finished in 8th place after being eliminated in the semifinal. Four years later in Rio de Janeiro he finished in 7th place in the same event.

His partner in the C2 boat is Luka Božič.

World Cup individual podiums

References

13 September 2009 final results of the men's C2 event at the 2009 ICF Canoe Slalom World Championships. - accessed 13 September 2009.

Living people
Slovenian male canoeists
1989 births
Canoeists at the 2012 Summer Olympics
Canoeists at the 2016 Summer Olympics
Olympic canoeists of Slovenia
People from Šempeter pri Gorici
Medalists at the ICF Canoe Slalom World Championships